Leona Dalrymple (1884 – 1968) was an early 20th century American writer of novels, short stories, and plays.

Biography
Leona Dalrymple was on February 11, 1884, in Passaic, New Jersey as the oldest child of New Jersey Assemblyman and former judge George H. Dalrymple and Carrie V. (Dean) Dalrymple. She grew up in Passaic, New Jersey, and graduated from Passaic High School in 1902. On February 7, 1921, she married Clarence Acton Wilson, a lifelong friend, in a Greenwich Village studio apartment ceremony.

Dalrymple's first publication was a play in 1905; the firm that published it later issued another dozen of her works, mostly written for amateur theatricals.

In 1913, Dalrymple won the then very large prize of $10,000 in a literary competition organized by the publisher Reilly & Britton and judged by Ida Tarbell and S.S. McClure. The winning entry was her romance novel Diane of the Green Van, published the following year. A second entry in the competition that was highly rated by the judges was also by Dalrymple; though slated for publication under the title The Nomad, it apparently was never issued, or at least not under that title.

Diane of the Green Van is a highly improbable Ruritanian romance whose plot involves an heiress who spends a year camping up and down the east coast in a caravan, the intrigues of a European kingdom called Houdania, a missing document, and any number of disguises. A contemporary reviewer wrote that while it was not very original it was romantic and amusing enough to hold the reader's attention. In 1919 it was made into a movie of the same title starring Alma Rubens.

Dalrymple also wrote  short stories for magazines like The Bohemian and  Ladies' Home Journal.

She died on October 22, 1968, in Stamford, Connecticut.

Publications
Novels
Mrs. Forrester's Crusade (1908)
Träumerei (1912)
Diane of the Green Van (1914)
The Lovable Meddler (1915)
Jimsy, The Christmas Kid (1915)
When the Yule-Log Burns (1916)
Kenny (1917)

Plays
Tangles: A Farce in One Act (1907)
While Brother Phil was Walking, a Farce in One Act (1908)

Short stories
Uncle Noah's Christmas Inspiration (1912)
In the Heart of the Christmas Pines (1913)

References

External links
 
 
 

1884 births
1968 deaths
20th-century American novelists
American women novelists
American women short story writers
American women screenwriters
20th-century American women writers
20th-century American short story writers
20th-century American screenwriters